Mortágua ( or ) is a municipality in the district of Viseu, Portugal. The population in 2011 was 9,607, in an area of 251.18 km2.

The present mayor is José Júlio Norte, elected in 2013 by the Social Democratic Party.

History
Legend suggests that that village was formed on a lake; settlers recalled that Água Morta (dead water) existed here, but no physiological evidence remains of the body of water. Over time, the name stayed and evolved, becoming the variant today of the local municipality.

About  from the main village is a hill, covered in vegetation, but whose lateral flank was occupied by a Moorish settlement known as Crasto. Over a cliff archeologists discovered several homes including a building that was defined as a kitchen, on its edge.

By 1895, several chapels were situated on this hilltop, which had become known as Cabeça da Senhora do Mundo (owing to the existence of an image to that invocation).

Geography
Administratively, the municipality is divided into 7 civil parishes (freguesias):
 Cercosa
 Espinho
 Marmeleira
 Mortágua, Vale de Remígio, Cortegaça e Almaça
 Pala
 Sobral
 Trezói

Notable people 
 Vasco Martins de Sousa (1320s-1387) Lord of Mortágua
 Fernanda de Paiva Tomás (1928–1984) a member of the Portuguese Communist Party, a political prisoner from 1961 to 1970, under the authoritarian Estado Novo regime.

Sport 
 Francisco Neto (born 1981) a football manager, currently the head coach of the Portugal women's national football team
 Filipe Sarmento (born 1985 in Mortágua) a Portuguese footballer with over 220 club caps

References

Notes

Sources

External links
Municipality official website

Towns in Portugal
Populated places in Viseu District
Municipalities of Viseu District